Singanamala Assembly constituency is a SC (Scheduled Caste) reserved constituency of the Andhra Pradesh Legislative Assembly, India. It is one among 14 constituencies in the Anantapur district.

Jonnalagadda Padmavathy of YSR Congress Party is currently representing the constituency.

Overview
It is part of the Anantapur Lok Sabha constituency along with another six Vidhan Sabha segments, namely, Rayadurg, Guntakal, Uravakonda, Tadpatri, Anantpur Urban and Kalyandurg in Anantapur district.

Mandals

Members of Legislative Assembly

Election results

Assembly Elections 2004

Assembly Elections 2009

Assembly elections 2014

Assembly elections 2019

See also
 List of constituencies of Andhra Pradesh Legislative Assembly

References

Assembly constituencies of Andhra Pradesh